Kaleshwaram is a village in Mahadevpur Mandal in Jayashankar Bhupalpally district in the Indian state of Telangana. This name refers more broadly to the state of Telangana & Kaleshwaram Temple.

Kaleshwaram is at the juncture of the rivers Godavari and its Pranahita tributary. It is 277 kilometres from Hyderabad, 125 kilometres from Karimnagar, 130 kilometres from Warangal, 95 kilometres from Ramagundam railway station, 60 kilometres from Godavarikhani, 75 kilometres from Parkal and 60 kilometres from Manthani. This place is also popularly known as second Kashi or southern Indian Kashi. It is 10 kilometres from Sironcha, Maharashtra.

Legend
Legend claims that a long time ago, a Vaishya had performed an Abhisheka to Lord Kaleshwara Mukteswara with hundreds of milk pots, and the milk evolved at the sangamam of Godavari and Pranahita.

Transport
Tsrtc Bus services are available from Hyderabad, Godavarikhani, Warangal, Parkal, Karimnagar, Gadchiroli, Sironcha, Aheri, Manthani, and Peddapalli.
Mainly Godavarikhani, Bhupalpally, Manthani, Hanamakonda bus depots run buses.

Theology
The name KALESHWARA indicates KALA(Who takes life(Death)) means Yama and ESHWARA(who gives life) means Shiva. This is a rare combination as the Life and Death are at same place. which is strong evidence that Life and Death are not different, they are Same.

Temple

It is the site of a temple of the Hindu god Shiva. The temple is significant because of the two Shiva Lingas that are found on a single pedestal. These Linga are named Lord Shiva and Lord Yama. Collectively, they are known as Kaleshwara Mukteswara Swamy. Kaleshwaram is one of three Shiva temples mentioned in Trilinga Desham, or "Land of Three Lingas."

The holy place draws tourists during the Karthika Month of the Indian Calendar, 16 November – 15 December. Holy baths are held during 6–17 of December. People who bathe here first visit Lord Ganesha, then pray to Lord Yama and then to Lord Shiva.

In Year 2018 March a new temple Sri Vasavi Kanyaka Parameswari temple was opened near Kaleshwara Mukteswara Swamy Temple. Adjacent to it we have a new Nitya Anna Dhana Vysya Satram too. Temple is funded and built by Rajaiah and Satyavathi Devi Daram. Everyday rituals are being performed by priests.

Kaleshwaram Lift Irrigation Project

The Kaleshwaram Lift Irrigation Project is a major irrigation project that was started in 2016. The massive project is intended to meet the irrigation needs of nearly three-fourths of Telangana with its headworks taken up at a cost of ₹  80500 crore.

References

Kaleshwaram
 Visit www.KaleshwaramTemple.in – Kaleshwaram Devasthanam – Sri Kaleshwara Muktheeshwara Devasthanam 
Visit https://traveltimings.in/hyderabad-kaleshwaram/ – For Hyderabad to Kaleshwaram Bus Timings – For Sri Kaleshwara Muktheeshwara Devasthanam 
The Kaleshwaram Lift Irrigation Project website

Villages in Jayashankar Bhupalpally district